There are two unrelated languages named Ika:

Ika language (Colombia), also known as Arhuaco
Ika language (Nigeria), a dialect in Delta State, Nigeria, spoken by the Ika people